The , official name , is a Buddhist temple in Kyoto, Japan, said to have been established by Prince Shōtoku. The name comes from its main hall's hexagonal shape. This temple is part of the Saigoku Kannon Pilgrimage.

History

Rokkaku-dō is believed to have been established in the early Heian period.

The origins of traditional Japanese flower arrangement through the Ikenobō school are linked to Rokkaku-dō in the medieval Muromachi period.

Rokkaku-dō was instrumental in the development of Jōdo Shinshū. In 1201 CE, Shinran undertook a 100-day retreat. He had a dream on the 95th day, seeing Prince Shōtoku (regarded as an incarnation of Avalokiteśvara), who directed him to another monk, Hōnen. Shinran subsequently became Hōnen's disciple, establishing Jōdo Shinshū within Hōnen's Jōdo-shū.

Legends 
According to legend, when Prince Shōtoku (聖徳太子) was a child on Awaji Island he found a small Chinese chest that had floated ashore. Opening the lid, the prince found a gold image about 5.5 cm long of the Nyoirin Kannon, which he decided to keep as a sacred Buddhist image or amulet. He prayed to the Kannon to bring him success, promising Kannon that he would build Shitenno-ji Temple (in the area of present Osaka) if he was successful.

In 587, Prince Shotoku decided to build the great temple of Shitennoj-i in Osaka. Searching for building materials, the prince journeyed out from Osaka. It was a hot day and the prince stopped by a pond to cool down. He took off his clothes and his precious amulet in order to bathe in the pond. He placed his clothes and the Nyoirin Kannon on a nearby tree. After his swim, he went to put on his clothes and put the Nyoirin Kannon back in his pocket. Suddenly the Kannon became too heavy to pick up and the prince was unable to continue. So the prince decided to spend the night there and await the morning.

During the night he dreamed that Nyoirin Kannon appeared to him saying, “With this amulet I have given you, I have protected many generations but now I wish to remain in this place. You must build a six sided temple and enshrine me within this temple. Many people will come here and be healed.” So Prince Shotoku built the temple and enshrined Nyoirin Kannon within it.

In 1204, when he was 29 years old, Shinran Shonin (1173 - 1263) decided to spend 100 days in seclusion or privacy at Rokkakudo Temple. On the 95th day, Kannon appeared to Shinran in a dream and told him to forgo his vow of celibacy and marry. She told him that she would appear to him in the form of a woman and they would become lovers and enter into Amida’s Paradise. She then told him that he should seek out Honen, his teacher, and found a new order of Buddhism that encouraged clerical marriage and family life. A small hexagonal hall at Rokkakudo features two statues of Shinran – one seated in a dream trance and one standing with walking staff and beads.

See also
 Daikaku-ji
 List of Buddhist temples in Kyoto
 For an explanation of terms concerning Japanese Buddhism, Japanese Buddhist art, and Japanese Buddhist temple architecture, see the Glossary of Japanese Buddhism

Notes

References
 Ponsonby-Fane, Richard Arthur Brabazon. (1956).  Kyoto: The Old Capital of Japan, 794-1869. Kyoto: The Ponsonby Memorial Society.  OCLC 36644

External links

  Kyoto City | Rokkaku-dō (Chōhō-ji Temple)

Religious organizations established in the 6th century
Buddhist temples in Kyoto
Shinran
Prince Shōtoku
Vaiśravaṇa